Edgar John Busch (November 16, 1917 – January 17, 1987) was a shortstop who played in Major League Baseball between the  and  seasons. He was born in Lebanon, Illinois.

Career
Busch started his professional career in 1938 in the St. Louis Browns minor league system, playing for them five years before being released in 1942. He was signed by the Philadelphia Athletics organization in 1943, when the military draft was depleting Major League rosters of first-line players due to World War II. He joined the big team in late September of that year.

A slick shortstop with good hands and a strong throwing arm, Busch was part of an infield that included Dick Siebert at first base, Irv Hall at second and George Kell at third. He was the starting shortstop for Philadelphia in 1944 and 1945, until Pete Suder returned to the team when the war ended.

In a 270-game career, Busch posted a .262 average (240-for-917), including 80 runs, 10 doubles, three triples, 75 RBI, seven stolen bases, and a .311 on-base percentage. In six minor league seasons, he hit .283 with 13 home runs in 737 games.

Busch died in St. Clair County, Illinois, at the age of 69.

Sources

Major League Baseball shortstops
Philadelphia Athletics players
Elmira Pioneers players
San Antonio Missions players
Baseball players from Illinois
1917 births
1987 deaths
People from Lebanon, Illinois